Scarab, in comics, may refer to:
 Scarab (Vertigo), a limited comic series
 Scarab (Nedor Comics), a Golden Age comic character
 Scarab (Awesome Comics), a member of the Re:Gex
 Scarab, a character in Kabuki
 Scarab, a Wildstorm character who fought Stormwatch: Team Achilles
 Scarlet Scarab, two Marvel Comics characters
 Silver Scarab, a character in DC Comics

See also
Scarab (disambiguation)

References